Sky Journey (Tian-Xing, 天行) 1 is a Chinese (USV) jointly developed by Harbin Engineering University (HEU) and Shenzhen HiSiBi Shipyard.
The existence of Sky Travel 1 usv was first revealed in December 2017 at the Fifth Chinese Oceanic Economic Exhibition jointly held by the provincial government of Guangdong and Chinese State Oceanic Administration in Zhanjiang.

Completed in September 2017, Sky Journey 1 is an air-cushioned vehicledesigned to perform various military, paramilitary and police tasks, and is equipped with RCWS that can be armed with various sensors and small cabiler guns.The combined diesel and electric propulsion system enable the USV to reach top speed of 50 kts.More than ten units have already been built by December 2017.Specification:
Length: 12.2 meter
Displacement: 7.5 ton
Top speed: 50 kt
Propulsion: combined diesel and electric

Reference

Auxiliary ships of the People's Liberation Army Navy
Unmanned surface vehicles of China